Boneyard may refer to:

 Cemetery or graveyard

Comics
 A character in the Malibu/Marvel Comics publication Mantra
 Boneyard (comics), a horror-themed comic book series by Richard Moore

Film and television 
 Boneyard (TV series), a History Channel TV series that documented vehicle boneyards
 The Boneyard, a 1991 direct-to-video horror film directed by James Cummins

Geography
 Boneyard Creek, a stream in Champaign County, Illinois, United States

Music 
 Ozzy's Boneyard, a classic hard rock music channel on Sirius XM Radio, previously known as "The Boneyard"
 An early 1990s Los Angeles glam-metal band featuring Chris Van Dahl
 A Rhode Island band featuring Gail Greenwood
 Joe Perry Boneyard Les Paul, a model guitar model endorsed by Joe Perry of Aerosmith
 BoneYard, a persona of the poet and musician Alan Pizzarelli
 "Boneyard", a song by Impetigo from Horror of the Zombies
 "Boneyards", a metalcore song by Parkway Drive from Horizons
 "Bone Yard", a song by Vermillion Lies

Other uses 
 Aircraft boneyard, list of retired aircraft storage facilities
 Boneyard (dominoes), the stock of tiles in dominoes from which the players draw.
 The Boneyard (Disney's Animal Kingdom), a dinosaur dig-site themed playground attractions at Disney's Animal Kingdom
 The Boneyard (Universal Studios Florida), a former attraction at Universal Studios Florida
 A place for the storage or cannibalization of retired vehicles or machinery; see Aircraft boneyard
 Boo's Boneyard Galaxy, a galaxy in the video game Super Mario Galaxy
 Boneyard Beach (disambiguation)